Uzunkol is a district of Kostanay Region in northern Kazakhstan. The administrative center of the district is the selo of Uzunkol. Population:

References

Districts of Kazakhstan
Kostanay Region